The Solon and Mathilda Sutliff House is a historic house located at 306 Dahl Street in Rhinelander, Wisconsin. It was added to the National Register of Historic Places on October 7, 2009.

History
It is a -story, stucco, Italian Renaissance variant of the Mediterranean Revival style. The house belonged to Solon and Mathilda Sutliff. Solon Sutliff was a native of Newaygo, Michigan.

References

Houses completed in 1923
Houses in Oneida County, Wisconsin
Houses on the National Register of Historic Places in Wisconsin
Italian Renaissance Revival architecture in the United States
National Register of Historic Places in Oneida County, Wisconsin